Ocean Island may refer to:
 Banaba Island, Kiribati
 Kure Atoll, Hawaii, United States
 Ocean Island Inn, a historic building in Victoria, British Columbia, Canada
 Ocean Island, in Port Ross harbour, Auckland Islands, New Zealand
 An alternative name for Tito v Waddell (No 2), a leading English trusts case

See also 
 Oceanic island, a type of island